The Wise Ministry was the 20th Ministry of the Government of Western Australia. It succeeded the Willcock Ministry on 3 August 1945 and was led by Labor Premier Frank Wise, who had previously been Minister for Lands and Agriculture. All of the Ministers continued from the previous Ministry, although in several cases with new or altered responsibilities. The Wise Ministry was succeeded by the McLarty–Watts Ministry on 1 April 1947 after Labor were defeated in the 1947 election.

Frank Wise was sworn in as Premier and Treasurer four days before the change of Ministry. Until 3 August, he also held the portfolios of Lands and Agriculture.

The members of the Wise Ministry were:

References
 Hansard (1945), p. v-vi.
 Western Australian Government Gazette, 31 July 1945, page 1945:703.
 

Western Australian ministries
Australian Labor Party ministries in Western Australia
Ministries of George VI